The Gunfighter is a 2014 short film directed by Eric Kissack. A twist on the Western genre, the film concerns a group of people in a saloon who, in an act of breaking the fourth wall, are able to hear the narrator of the film.

Plot
A gunfighter enters a saloon, and his actions are narrated by an unseen voice, much to the confusion of those in the saloon. The narrator begins revealing the thoughts of the characters, as a typical film narrator would, yet the thoughts are mostly personal or humiliating to the characters. The characters test the narrator's truthfulness by instructing a woman, Sally, to think of a number, which the narrator correctly states. Once the narrator makes it known that almost every patron of the bar has practiced infidelity and the gunfighter himself is gay, almost every character draws a gun, initiating a Mexican standoff. The gunfighter realises the narrator's sadism, as he is trying to make the patrons kill one another.

He gives a speech about disregarding the narrator's divisive language and coming together to form a utopia. The narrator then discloses that the gunslinger had killed the son of one of the patrons, after which everyone shoots at each other. By the end of the shootout, each patron in the saloon is killed, except for Sally, whom the narrator explains will die from mauling by a rabid wolf the following day.

Cast
 Shawn Parsons as the Gunfighter
 Nick Offerman as the Narrator
 Scott Beehner as Tommy Henderson
 Brace Harris as Johnny Henderson
 Eileen O'Connell as Sally
 Jordan Black as Sam
 Timothy Brennen as Bill Jessup
 Travis Lincoln Cox as Elijah Jessup
 Schoen Hodges as Gabriel Jessup

Production
The film was shot at the Melody Ranch Motion Picture Studio in Santa Clarita, California, and was partly inspired by the television series Deadwood. It was filmed over the course of a weekend, on a budget of under $25,000, much of which went towards costume design and props. The film's director, Eric Kissack, contacted comedic writer and filmmaker David Wain in order to help cast actor Nick Offerman as the unseen narrator. The film was presented to Offerman with a different narrating voice to act as a placeholder until a superior narrator was acquired. Offerman enjoyed the film and his narration, which is present in the finished film, was subsequently recorded.

Reception and awards
The Gunfighter has received mostly positive reviews. The film won the Audience Award for Best Short Film at the 2014 Los Angeles Film Festival and was a "Best of Fest Selection" at the 2014 Palm Springs International Festival of Short Films. Film reviewer John Arkelian wrote that, in regards to the narration, "it’s an omniscient author getting in the way of his own characters. The result is quite amusing, if sometimes vulgar."

See also
 Fourth wall
 Meta-reference
 Unreliable narrator

References

External links
 
 

2014 films
2014 comedy films
2014 short films
2010s Western (genre) comedy films
American short films
American Western (genre) comedy films
2010s English-language films
2010s American films